(English: "Such Is New Mexico") is the official Spanish language State Song of the U.S. State of New Mexico, composed in a New Mexico music style. The words and music were created by contemporary composer Amadeo Lucero. It was performed with guitar accompaniment to the assembled members of the Legislature by Lieutenant Governor Roberto Mondragón at the opening session in 1971. It was enthusiastically received and promptly adopted as the Spanish-language version of the State Song.

Lyrics

See also
O Fair New Mexico – The English state song

References

New Mexico
Music of New Mexico
Spanish-American culture in New Mexico
Symbols of New Mexico
1971 songs
Songs about New Mexico